Çeribaşı can refer to:

 Çeribaşı, Bigadiç
 Çeribaşı, Enez